Lesbian, gay, bisexual, and transgender (LGBT) people in Japan face some legal challenges not experienced by non-LGBT residents, although the social component is more reliable than in many Asian countries. Same-sex sexual activity was criminalised only briefly in Japan's history between 1872 and 1880, after which a localised version of the Napoleonic Penal Code was adopted with an equal age of consent. Same-sex couples and households headed by same-sex couples are ineligible for the legal protections available to opposite-sex couples, although since 2015 some cities and prefectures offer symbolic "partnership certificates" to recognise the relationships of same-sex couples. Japan is the only country in the G7 that does not legally recognize same-sex unions in any form. In March 2021, the Sapporo District Court ruled that not recognising same-sex marriage was a violation of the Constitution. In June 2022, the Osaka District Court ruled that not recognising same-sex marriage was not a violation of the Constitution. In November 2022, the Tokyo District Court ruled that the absence of same-sex marriage legislation was an unconstitutional state of affairs but did not violate the Constitution, though the court’s ruling has no immediate legal effect.

Japan's culture and major religions do not have a history of hostility towards homosexuality. A majority of Japanese citizens are reportedly in favor of accepting homosexuality, with a 2019 poll indicating that 68 percent agreed that homosexuality should be accepted by society, while 22 percent disagreed. Although many political parties have not openly supported or opposed LGBT rights, there are several openly LGBT politicians in office. A law allowing transgender individuals to change their legal gender post-sex reassignment surgery and sterilization was passed in 2003. Discrimination on the basis of sexual orientation and gender identity is banned in some cities, including Tokyo.

Tokyo Rainbow Pride has been held annually since 2012, with attendance increasing every year. A 2015 opinion poll found that a majority of Japanese supported the legalisation of same-sex marriage. Further opinion polls conducted over the following years have found high levels of support for same-sex marriage among the Japanese public, most notably the younger generation. However, a 2020 survey of over 10,000 LGBT people in Japan found that 38 percent had been harassed or assaulted.

History

Homosexuality and same-sex relations have been documented in Japan since ancient times.

In the pre-Meiji period, nanshoku (男色) relationships inside Buddhist monasteries were typically pederastic. The relationship would be dissolved once the boy reached adulthood (or left the monastery). Both parties were encouraged to treat the relationship seriously and conduct the affair honorably, and the nenja might be required to write a formal vow of fidelity. During the Tokugawa period, some of the Shinto gods, especially Hachiman, Myoshin, Shinmei and Tenjin, "came to be seen as guardian deities of nanshoku" (male–male love).

From religious circles, same-sex love spread to the warrior (samurai) class, where it was customary for a boy in the wakashū age category to undergo training in the martial arts by apprenticing to a more experienced adult man. The relationship was based on the typical nenja, who loves, and the typically younger chigo, who is loved. The man was permitted, if the boy agreed, to take the boy as his lover until he came of age. These relationships were expected to be exclusive, with both partners swearing to take no other (male) lovers.

As Japan progressed into the Meiji era, same-sex practices continued; however, there was a growing animosity towards these practices. The practice of nanshoku began to die out after the Russo-Japanese War. Opposition to homosexuality did not become firmly established in Japan until the 19th and 20th centuries, through the Westernization efforts of the Empire of Japan.

Terminology

Legality of same-sex sexual activity

Homosexuality is legal in Japan. There are no explicit religious prohibitions against homosexuality in the traditional religion of Japan, Shinto, or in the imported religions of Buddhism (see "Buddhism and sexual orientation") or Confucianism.

Sodomy was first criminalized in Japan in 1872, in the early Meiji era, to comply with the newly introduced beliefs of Western culture and the Qing legal codes. But this provision was repealed only seven years later by the Penal Code of 1880 in accordance with the Napoleonic Penal Code. Since then, Japan has had no laws against homosexuality. Thus, sex among consenting adults, in private, regardless of sexual orientation and/or gender, is legal under Japanese law.

Recognition of same-sex relationships

Article 24 of the Japanese Constitution states that "Marriage shall be based only on the mutual consent of both sexes and it shall be maintained through mutual cooperation with the equal rights of husband and wife as a basis." Articles 731 to 737 of the Japanese Civil Code limit marriage to different-sex couples. Same-sex couples are not able to marry, and same-sex couples are not granted rights derived from marriage. Also, same-sex marriages performed abroad are not legally recognized in Japan and bi-national same-sex couples cannot obtain a visa for the foreign partner based on their relationship, though the Ministry of Justice does have a general rule of giving the discretionary "designated activities" visa to same-sex married spouses.

In March 2009, Japan began allowing Japanese nationals to marry same-sex partners in countries where same-sex marriage is legal. The Justice Ministry instructed local authorities to issue key certificates, which state that a person is single and of legal age, to individuals seeking to enter same-sex marriages in areas that legally allow it.

In February 2015, the ward of Shibuya (in Tokyo) announced plans to establish a partnership system that would recognize same-sex couples for situations such as hospital visits and shared renting of apartments. This procedure allows couples to get a "proof of partnership" paper, which does not have any weight under Japanese law but can help in, for instance, getting access to a partner who is ill and in hospital but institutions are under no legal obligation to respect the certificates. The Shibuya system is considered a significant step towards lesbian and gay partnership rights in Japan. In July 2015, Tokyo's Setagaya ward announced that it would be joining Shibuya in recognizing same-sex partnerships from November of the same year. Since then, 100 municipalities have begun issuing partnership certificates, including highly-populated Yokohama, Osaka, Sapporo, Fukuoka, Kyoto, Kawasaki, Saitama and Hiroshima, as well as ten prefectures, including Ibaraki, Osaka, Gunma, Saga and Mie.

On 17 March 2021, a district court in Sapporo ruled that laws or regulations that deprive same-sex couples of the right to marry constitute unlawful discrimination and violate Article 14 of the Constitution of Japan. The court found that Article 24 does not prohibit the recognition of same-sex marriages. The ruling did not legalize same-sex marriage in Japan, but is likely to step up pressure on the National Diet to act.

Yasuhiko Watanabe, a law professor at Kyoto Sangyo University, stated that if Japan recognizes same-sex marriage, that would impact the whole of Asia, proving that it is allowed not only in Western societies.

On 26 June 2022, a district court in Osaka brought down a conflicting ruling to the ruling from the previous year out of Sapporo. It ruled that a ban on same-sex marriage is not unconstitutional. The ruling did not change the legal status of same-sex marriage in Japan as it did not occur at a court with the power to set binding legal precedent. The plaintiffs have indicated plans to appeal the decision. Other similar court cases in other district courts in Tokyo, Nagoya and Fukuoka remain ongoing. In addition, the Tokyo metropolitan government recently announced a plan, set to take effect in October, to accept registrations from same-sex couples seeking certificates of their partnerships. On 1 November, Tokyo finally implemented a legally recognised relationship registration scheme for same-sex couples.

Adoption and parenting
Same-sex couples are not allowed to legally adopt in Japan. Lesbian couples and single women are unable to access IVF and artificial insemination. In December 2022, a "very broard and comprehensive fertility bill" was introduced in Japan - that explicitly and legally only allows heterosexual married women access to IVF treatment.

In April 2017, Osaka officially recognised a same-sex couple as foster parents, making it the first such case in Japan.

36 municipalities and Tokyo Metropolis have also established a "partnership family system". This system, which allows registered partners to optionally designate children in the household in a limited form of second-parent adoption, also recognises the children of same-sex couples, and allows partners to make medical decisions for their child, and to pick up their children at schools and kindergartens (whereas previously only the biological parent was allowed to pick up the child). The first to establish this system was Akashi, Hyōgo in January 2021 followed by Tokushima in February 2021 and Adachi, Tokyo in April 2021.

Discrimination protections
As of 2021, sexual orientation and gender identity are not protected by national civil rights laws, which means that LGBT Japanese have few legal recourses when faced with discrimination in such areas as employment, education, housing, health care and banking. According to a 2018 Dentsu Diversity Lab survey, more than 65% of questioned LGBT people said they had not come out to anyone at work or home.

The Japanese Constitution promises equal rights and is interpreted to prohibit discrimination on all grounds. However, homosexual and transgender persons can experience physical, sexual and psychological violence at the hands of their opposite-sex or same-sex partners, but receive no protection from the law. Same-sex partners are excluded from the Act on the Prevention of Spousal Violence and the Protection of Victims and generally lack safe places where they can seek help and support.

In 2013, Yodogawa-ku, Osaka, became the first Japanese government area to pass a resolution officiating support for LGBT inclusion, including mandating LGBT sensitivity training for ward staff. Naha followed suit in July 2015.

In October 2018, the Tokyo Metropolitan Assembly passed a law prohibiting all discrimination on the basis of sexual orientation and gender identity. The law, which took effect in April 2019, also commits the Metropolitan Government to raise awareness of LGBT people and "conduct measures needed to make sure human rights values are rooted in all corners of the city". The law outlaws expressing hateful rhetoric in public. Prior to this, the wards of Shibuya and Setagaya had already passed explicit protections for LGBT people.

In December 2018, four political parties, the Constitutional Democratic Party of Japan, the Democratic Party for the People, the Japanese Communist Party, and the Liberal Party, along with the support of several independents, introduced to the House of Representatives a bill entitled the Proposed Law on the Promotion of the Elimination of Discrimination based on Sexual Orientation and Gender Identity to prohibit discrimination, harassment and bullying at schools on the basis of sexual orientation.

In March 2019, legislation banning discrimination against "sexual minorities" was passed in Ibaraki Prefecture.

Human Rights Watch, J-ALL (Japan Alliance for LGBT Legislation) and Athlete Ally urged Prime Minister Shinzo Abe to support legislation protecting LGBT people against discrimination on the basis of gender and sexual orientation. On 17 April 2020, 96 human rights and LGBT organizations sent a letter to the Prime Minister calling for the passage of a non-discrimination law.

In April 2022, legislation prohibiting discrimination among others sexual orientation and gender identity came into operation in Akita Prefecture.

Employment discrimination
While the Equal Employment Opportunity Law has been revised several times over the years to address sex discrimination and harassment in the workplace, the government has refused to expand the law to address discrimination against gender or sexual identity. The Tokyo Metropolitan Government has passed legislation banning discrimination in employment based on sexual orientation and gender identity.

Companies in Japan consisting of ten or more employees are required to establish work regulations. In January 2018, the Ministry of Health, Labor and Welfare revised the Model Rules of Employment (モデル就業規則) which "stands as the example framework for work regulations", to prohibit discrimination based on sexual orientation and "gender identification". Article 15 reads:

Housing discrimination
In 1990, the group OCCUR (Japan Association for the Lesbian and Gay Movement) won a court case against a Tokyo government policy that barred gay and lesbian youth from using the "Metropolitan House for Youth". While the court ruling does not seem to have extended to other areas of government-sponsored discrimination, it is cited by the courts as a civil rights case.

Since autumn 2003, the Urban Renaissance Agency, the government agency that operates government housing has allowed same-sex couples to rent units the same way as heterosexual couples at any one of the over 300 properties that it operates. This opened the way for more such action, as the Osaka Government in September 2005 opened the doors of its government housing to same-sex couples.

In February 2018, the Ministry of Health, Labor and Welfare created provisions addressing discrimination in housing, stating that "consideration must be taken to not deny lodging on the basis of sexual orientation or gender identity."

In October 2020, The Guardian reported that several Japanese love hotels were denying entry to same-sex couples for the sole reason of their sexual orientation, despite it being illegal under federal law since 2018 as per the guidelines issued by the Ministry of Health, Labor and Welfare.

Bullying in schools
In 2017, the Education Ministry added sexual orientation and gender identity to its national bullying policy. The policy mandates that schools should prevent bullying of students based on their sexual orientation or gender identity by "promoting proper understanding of teachers on … sexual orientation/gender identity as well as making sure to inform on the school's necessary measures regarding this matter."

Others
In January 2018, after a high-profile incident in 2015 in which a gay student at Hitotsubashi University died by suicide after being outed against his will, the city of Kunitachi passed an "anti-outing" ordinance to promote understanding of LGBT people. Mie Prefecture passed a similar "anti-outing" law in March 2021.

In June 2019, after three years of consultations, a special committee of the ruling Liberal Democratic Party (LDP) announced the LGBT Understanding and Enhancement Bill, which aims to improve understanding of LGBT issues, would be introduced to the National Diet. However, LGBT rights activists criticized the bill for falling short by not mentioning same-sex marriage or anti-discrimination protections.

In April 2021, the LDP announced it would pass the LGBT Understanding and Enhancement Bill during the current Diet session, set to end in June. The bill only requires the government to "promote understanding of LGBT people" and does not actually ban discrimination.

Transgender rights

Passage of the law on gender recognition 

In 2003, a law was passed allowing transgender people to change their gender marker on legal documents. Approval requires being over 22 years old, unmarried, undergoing sex reassignment surgery, sterilization, and having no children under 20. The law, known as the Act on Special Cases in Handling Gender Status for Persons with Gender Identity Disorder or simply Law 111, went into effect in July 2004, and was upheld by the Supreme Court of Japan in January 2019. By that date, 7,000 persons had legally changed gender. The court wanted to prevent "confusion" within parent-child relations, as well as "abrupt changes" in Japanese society. Two of the majority judges still issued a call for society to "embrace the diversity of sexual identity", also adding that the requirements were invasive and encouraged the National Diet to review them.

Socio-cultural background 

Yale University professor Karen Nakamura notes in a discussion held October 2015 that "Japanese transgender activists present their gender identity as a disability in order to achieve more social and legal change in Japanese society", employing the medical diagnostic term of "gender identity disability" (性同一性障害, seidoitsusei shougai), instead of "gender identity disorder", which is more common in English-medium materials). This in part arises from what Nakamura calls a "translation fluke"; shougai can be fluidly interpreted as inter alia either "disability" or "disorder". According to Nakamura, this is because there is a strong protection in Japanese society and laws for disabled persons; therefore, identifying more as members of the disability community rather than the queer community has allowed transgender Japanese to assert their rights in law and society more strongly without social ostracization, moreso than LGB Japanese.

Conflict of private international law 
Even though surgery is required as a condition to change one's registered gender in the Japanese courts, this only applies to Japanese nationals. Foreign nationals change their registered gender with the country of their nationality, then reporting the change to the Immigration Services Agency to be reflected on their residence card. This conflict of laws can lead to bureaucratic breakdown.

In 2018, U.S. national and Aoyama Gakuin University lecturer Elin McCready changed her legal gender to female in the United States. After the change, municipal offices in the Meguro and Ota wards of Tokyo refused to recognize it, citing her subsisting marriage to Midori Morita-McCready, a Japanese national - which the legal gender recognition would make a same-sex marriage. This led them to pursue a lawsuit against the local and central governments. Their attorney, Toshimasa Yamashita, said that following the precedent set in the 2018 Sapporo court case on same-sex marriage, this refusal was unconstitutional.

Other developments 

On 24 February 2012, the Hyogo Lawyers' Association recommended that a transgender woman in a male prison be transferred to a female institution. According to this report, she had been placed in a male institution because of her legal sex, despite having undergone sex reassignment surgery prior to her detention, and was not treated as a woman in any way. She was subject to body checks by male staff, had her hair shaved, and was denied feminine clothing.

Since April 2018, transgender people have been covered for sex reassignment surgery as long as they are not receiving hormone treatment. The Ministry of Health, Labor and Welfare has also allowed transgender people to use their preferred names on their health insurance cards.

In June 2018, the Japanese Government enacted a new law lowering the age of majority in Japan to 18. Among others, the new law sets the age of marriage at 18 for both men and women (previously women could marry at the age of 16) and allows 18-year-olds to obtain valid passports, credit cards, etc. The law also allows people diagnosed with gender dysphoria and who have undergone irreversible sterilization to legally change their sex at the age of 18. The changes took effect on 1 April 2022.

In October 2020, Human Rights Watch wrote a letter urging Japan officials to allow transgender women to enroll in public women's universities in the country. Ochanomizu University in Tokyo became the first public women's university in Japan to admit transgender women who had not changed their legal gender to 'female'.

In January 2022, a transgender individual was arrested for "using the wrong bathroom" in Osaka. The Osaka Prefectural Police has declined to pursue charges, instead leaving that decision up to state prosecutors. Mikiya Nakatsuka, professor of health sciences at Okayama University and president of the Japanese Society of Gender Identity Disorder, stated that most transgender persons in Japan "paid attention when they used toilets at public facilities so they [could] stay out of trouble], and expressed concern that this single case would be applied erroneously to the wider transgender community, creating unwarranted prejudice and discrimination.

Blood donation
Gay and bisexual men are allowed to donate blood in Japan following a six-month abstinence from sex. While women and heterosexual men only need to wait six-months after being with a new partner of the opposite sex.

Military service

The Japan Self-Defense Forces, when being asked about their policy toward people who are gay or lesbian following the U.S. debate during the Clinton presidency, answered that it was not an issue, and individuals within the forces indicated that as long as same-sex relations did not lead to fights or other trouble, there were few, if any, barriers to their inclusion in the armed services.

Celebrities
While representations of homosexuals in the Japanese media tend towards caricature on the basis of stereotypes of sexual or behavioral deviance (e.g. the actually straight Hard Gay), there are several examples of transgender and non-binary celebrities in Japan such as Haruna Ai, Kayo Satoh, Ataru Nakamura, Kaba-chan, Hikaru Utada and Ikko. Several prominent musicians including Yoshinori Kanemoto and Ayumi Hamasaki have large LGBT fanbases as a result of their support for the LGBT community; among other activities, Hikaru Utada featured a gay teddybear called Kuma who she introduced as far back as 2010, and Ayumi Hamasaki headlined at Tokyo's 2018 Pride festival (incidentally, Hamasaki starred in the LGBT-themed movie Nagisa no Shindobaddo in the 1990s). Various celebrities have dedicated airtime on radios and podcasts to LGBT topics and supporting LGBT issues. Sho Sakurai of Arashi held an interview with drag queens in 2015 in Shinjuku Ni-chōme and was given the nickname "Cherry Shoko in the Sky". Matsuko Deluxe is a famous and well-respected drag queen TV personality along the lines of Lily Savage (UK) and Dame Edna (Australia). The education specialist Naoki Ogi (more colloquially known by teachers across Japan by his nickname "Ogimama") has in past years given focus to LGBT issues in schools. Support for LGBT rights has been expressed by corporate executives and Olympic athlete Dai Tamesue. One of famous Japanese director Hirokazu Kore-eda's earliest movies, a documentary called "August without Him", released in 1994, follows Hirata Yutaka, the first openly gay AIDS sufferer in Japan. Filmed over a series of months, it contrasts his public life as an outspoken figure on the lecture circuit with his personal descent into illness and death.

Political support

Most political parties in Japan have formal positions in favor or against LGBT rights in their party's platform or manifesto. The Liberal Democratic Party (LDP) has indicated opposition to legalizing same-sex marriage, whereas the Constitutional Democratic Party (CDP), the Communist Party and the Social Democratic Party have indicated support for legalization.

In 2001, the Council for Human Rights Promotion, under the Ministry of Justice, recommended that sexual orientation be included in the nation's civil rights code, but the National Diet refused to adopt the recommendation.

In 2003, Aya Kamikawa became the first openly transgender politician to be elected to public office in Japan, winning a seat on the Setagaya Ward Assembly. She initially ran as an independent but expressed support for the now-defunct Rainbow and Greens party and later unsuccessfully ran for the National Parliament as a member of the Democratic Party of Japan.

In 2005, Kanako Otsuji, from the Osaka Prefectural Assembly (2003–2007), became the first openly gay politician in Japan, when she formally came out at the Tokyo Gay Pride Festival. She later briefly served on the House of Councillors in 2013. Following the 2017 general election, Otsuji became the first openly lesbian member of the House of Representatives.

In 2010, Tokyo Governor Shintaro Ishihara faced international criticism for controversial comments he made, in which he said that gays and lesbians were "deficient somehow. It may be attributed to something genetic. I feel sorry for them being a minority."

In 2011, Taiga Ishikawa became the first openly gay man elected to office in Japan, winning a seat in the local assembly of Toshima Ward. He came out publicly in his book Where Is My Boyfriend (2002), and started a non-profit organization that sponsors social events for gay men in Japan. At the 2019 House of Councillors election, Ishikawa won a seat in the House of Councillors as a member of the CDP, the first openly gay man to do so. After his election, he vowed to legalize same-sex marriage and enact anti-discrimination laws within the six years of his term.

At the 2016 House of Councillors election, the conservative governing LDP included in its manifesto, that "same-sex marriage is incompatible with the Constitution". However, it also included "promoting understanding of sexual diversity" in its platform, a move that would have been "unthinkable" in earlier times and that lawmaker Gaku Hashimoto attributed in part to burnishing the country's international image in advance of the 2020 Summer Olympics in Tokyo. In 2019, former Defense Minister Tomomi Inada said she was unsure whether she would be able to introduce new legislation seeking greater tolerance of same-sex relationships amid opposition from her LDP colleagues. While Inada announced she wishes to "promote understanding" of LGBT people, she stated she is not trying to get Japan to legalize same-sex marriage or ban discrimination against LGBT citizens. Some LDP members have made controversial statements, such as Katsuei Hirasawa who argued in a speech in February 2019 that the "nation would collapse" if everyone were gay. Another ruling party lawmaker, Mio Sugita, published a magazine article in 2018 describing same-sex couples as "unproductive" because they do not have children.

In March 2017, Tomoya Hosoda was elected to the Iruma Assembly, in the prefecture of Saitama. Hosoda is believed to be the first openly transgender man elected to public office in the world.

During the country's 2017 general election, Tokyo Governor Yuriko Koike's newly launched Party of Hope pledged the elimination of LGBT discrimination in its manifesto.

In January 2019, trans woman Maria Akasaka became a member of the Kameoka City Assembly, in Kyoto Prefecture. In April 2019, another trans woman, Ayako Fuchigami, won a seat on the Hokkaido Prefectural Assembly representing Sapporo's Higashi-ku ward. She became the first openly transgender person to hold a prefectural assembly position in Japan.

In June 2019, the CDP added introducing legislation aimed at ending discrimination against the LGBT community and legalising same-sex marriage to their party platforms ahead of the 2019 Japanese House of Councillors election.

In May 2021, Japan’s conservative governing LDP has been accused of violating the Olympic charter after it failed to approve a bill to protect the rights of the LGBT community, during discussions marred by homophobic outbursts from conservative MPs. Closed meetings held in May to discuss a bill, proposed by opposition parties, ended without agreement after some LDP MPs said the rights of sexual minorities had "gone too far". An unnamed lawmaker described LGBT people as "morally unacceptable", while another MP, Kazuo Yana, said sexual minorities were "resisting the preservation of the species that occurs naturally in biological terms", media reports said. The failure to back a proposed law to protect LGBT rights was condemned by human rights groups, which said the party deserved a "gold medal for homophobia".

In July 2022, LGBT rights activists and supporters protested in front of the ruling Liberal Democratic Party's headquarters after an intra-party panel meeting circulated a booklet claiming that "homosexuality is a mental disease or addiction."
The text was packed with false information, including "It's not the case that high suicide rates among LGBT people can be attributed to discrimination within society," and, "We should not legitimatize the sexual lifestyles of sexual minorities as it will become a social problem which will destroy families and society."

Summary table

See also

LGBT rights in Tokyo
Human rights in Japan
Situation of homosexuals in the Japanese military (JSDF)
LGBT rights in Asia

Notes

References

External links
 . Human Rights Watch (8 July 2016)

 
Japanese culture
Law of Japan
Japan
Politics of Japan